European Beach Handball Championship may refer to
 European Men's Beach Handball Championship
 European Women's Beach Handball Championship